Milojko "Mile" Kitić (born 1 January 1952) is a Bosnian-born Serbian folk singer. He rose to prominence as a member of the popular eighties folk collective Južni Vetar with fellow folk singers Sinan Sakić, Dragana Mirković, Kemal Malovčić and Šemsa Suljaković. One of his first hits was song "Mala, mala iz Novog Pazara" (Baby Girl, Baby Girl from Novi Pazar).

Life and career
Kitić was born on New Year's Day, 1952, in the village of Cerani near the town of Derventa, People's Republic of Bosnia and Herzegovina PR Bosnia and Herzegovina, Federal People's Republic of Yugoslavia Yugoslavia. He graduated from high school in Vogošća. And he also  Serbian Orthodox . 

His first release was "Čija si ljubav" (Whose Love Are You) in 1975, while his debut album was released in 1982. He joined Južni Vetar in 1984, and gained almost instant success with the album and single "Čaša ljubavi" (Glass of Love). While in the group he also collaborated with fellow Yugoslav folk singers Sinan Sakić, Dragana Mirković, Kemal Malovčić and Šemsa Suljaković. During the Bosnian War of the 1990s, he and his family fled to Belgrade.

Kitić has two daughters from two marriages and two granddaughters from his firstborn. He resides between Belgrade and Hanover with his second wife, also a well-known singer, Marta Savić. His younger daughter Elena Kitić is an R&B singer.

Discography

Moja slatka mala (1982)
Jorgovani plavi (1983)
Čaša ljubavi (1984)
Ja neću ljepšu (1985)
Kockar (1986)
Mogao sam biti car (1987)
Što da ne (1988)
Osvetnik   (1989)
Stavi karte na sto (1990)
Gledaj me u oči (1991)
Ćao, Jelena (1992)
Vuk samotnjak (1993)
Moj sokole (1994)
Okreni jastuk (1995)
Ratnik za ljubav  (1996)
Ostaj ovde  (1997)
Do sreće daleko, do Boga visoko  (1998)
Tri života  (1999)
Zlato, srebro, dukati  (2000)
Plava ciganko (2001)
Budi moja  (2001)
Policijo, oprosti mi (2003)
Zemljotres (2004)
Šampanjac (2005)
Šanker  (2008)
Paklene godine (2012)
Rakija (2013)
Nokaut (2014)
Mađioničar (2017)

See also
Music of Bosnia
List of Bosnia and Herzegovina people#Music
Turbo-folk

References

External links
Official website, archive

1952 births
Living people
People from Derventa
Yugoslav male singers
Serbian folk-pop singers
Serbian folk singers
Grand Production artists
Yugoslav Wars refugees
Bosnia and Herzegovina expatriates in Germany
Refugees in Serbia
21st-century Serbian male singers
20th-century Serbian male singers
Serbs of Bosnia and Herzegovina